The Pervert's Guide to Cinema is a 2006 documentary directed and produced by Sophie Fiennes, scripted and presented by Slavoj Žižek. It explores a number of films from a psychoanalytic theoretical perspective.

Fiennes and Žižek released a follow-up, The Pervert's Guide to Ideology on 15 November 2012, with a similar format; Žižek speaks from within reconstructed scenes from films.

List of films discussed

 Possessed (1931)
 Monkey Business (1931)
 Frankenstein (1931)
 City Lights (1931)
 Duck Soup (1933)
 The Testament of Dr. Mabuse (1933)
 Pluto's Judgement Day (1935)
 The Wizard of Oz (1939)
 The Great Dictator (1940)
 Saboteur (1942)
 Dead of Night (1945)
 The Red Shoes (1948)
 Kubanskie Kazaki (1949)
 Alice in Wonderland (1951)
 Rear Window (1954)
 To Catch a Thief (1955)
 The Ten Commandments (1956)
 Vertigo (1958)
 Ivan the Terrible: Part II (1958)
 North by Northwest (1959)
 Seconds (1966)
 Psycho (1960)
 The Birds (1963)
 Dr. Strangelove or: How I Learned to Stop Worrying and Love the Bomb (1964)
 Persona (1966)
 Solaris (1972)
 The Exorcist (1973)
 The Conversation (1974)
 Alien (1979)
 Stalker (1979)
 Dune (1984)
 Blue Velvet (1986)
 Wild at Heart (1990)
 Three Colors: Blue (1993)
 Lost Highway (1997)
 Alien: Resurrection (1997)
 The Matrix (1999)
 Fight Club (1999)
 Eyes Wide Shut (1999)
 Mulholland Drive (2001)
 The Piano Teacher (2001)
 In the Cut (2003)
 Dogville (2003)
 Star Wars: Episode III – Revenge of the Sith (2005)

Reception
The Pervert's Guide to Cinema holds an 87% approval rating on Rotten Tomatoes, based on reviews from 23 critics.

See also
 Examined Life
 Jacques Lacan
 Marx Reloaded
 Liebe Dein Symptom wie Dich selbst!
 The Pervert's Guide to Ideology
 The Reality of the Virtual
 Žižek!

References

External links
 
 
 Complete transcript of the first part with added commentary and stills.

Works by Slavoj Žižek
2006 films
Academic works about film theory
Documentary films about films
2006 documentary films
Documentary films about psychology
2000s English-language films